MediaCorp Channel 8's television series In The Name Of Love is a romance drama series produced by MediaCorp Singapore in 2014. 

As of 22 July 2014, all 20 episodes of In The Name Of Love have been aired on MediaCorp Channel 8.

Episodic guide

See also
 List of MediaCorp Channel 8 Chinese Drama Series (2010s)
 In The Name Of Love

References

Lists of Singaporean television series episodes